Theodore William Schultz (30 April 1902 – 26 February 1998) was an American Agricultural economist and chairman of the University of Chicago Department of Economics. Schultz rose to national prominence after winning the 1979 Nobel Memorial Prize in Economic Sciences.

Early life and education
Theodore William Schultz was born on April 30, 1902 in a small town ten miles northwest of Badger, South Dakota on a 560-acre farm. When Schultz was in the eighth grade, his father Henry decided to pull him out of attending Kingsbury County Schoolhouse. His father's view was that if his eldest son continued to get an education he would be less inclined to continue working on the farm. Schultz subsequently did not have any formal post-secondary education. 

He eventually enrolled in the Agriculture College at South Dakota State, in a three-year program that met for four months a year during the winter. After being recognized for having great potential as a student, Schultz moved on to a bachelor's program, earning his degree in 1928 in agriculture and economics. He also received an honorary doctorate of science degree from the College in 1959. He graduated in 1927, then entered the University of Wisconsin–Madison earning his doctorate in Agricultural Economics in 1930 under Benjamin H. Hibbard with a thesis, titled The Tariff in Relation to the Coarse-Feed Grains and a Development of Some of the Theoretical Aspects of Tariff Price Research.

Academic career
Schultz taught at Iowa State College from 1930 to 1943.
He left Iowa State in the wake of the "oleomargarine controversy", and he served as the chair of economics at the University of Chicago from 1946 to 1961. He became a member of the American Academy of Arts and Sciences in 1958, the American Philosophical Society in 1962, and the United States National Academy of Sciences in 1974. He became president of the American Economic Association in 1960. He retired in 1970 though he remained active at the University of Chicago into his 90s until a fractured hip left him bedridden.

Shortly after his move to Chicago, Schultz attracted his former student, D. Gale Johnson to the department. Their research in farm and agricultural economics was widely influential and attracted funding from the Rockefeller Foundation to the agricultural economics program at the University. Among the graduate students and faculty affiliated with the pair in the 1940s and 1950s were Clifford Hardin, Zvi Griliches, Marc Nerlove, and George S. Tolley. In 1979, Schultz was awarded the Nobel Prize in Economics for his work in human capital theory and economic development.

Contribution to economic theory

Human capital theory

While he was chair of economics at Chicago he led research into why post-World War II Germany and Japan recovered, at almost miraculous speeds, from the widespread devastation. Contrast this with the United Kingdom which was still rationing food long after the war. His conclusion was that the speed of recovery was due to a healthy and highly educated population; education makes people productive and good health care keeps the education investment around and able to produce. One of his main contributions was later called Human Capital Theory, which he formulated with the help of Gary Becker and Jacob Mincer. Schultz coined this theory in his book titled Investment in Human Capital; however, he experienced negative feedback from other economists. He states that knowledge and skill are a form of capital, and investments in human capital leads to an increase in both economic output and workers’ earnings. Many economists refused to support his theory of considering humans as a form of capital due to slavery, which at the time was an understandable critique given the civil rights movements at this time. Schultz argues that his theory does not dismiss humanity but instead encourages individuals to invest in themselves. He advocates for humans to invest in their health, internal migration, and on-the-job training; however, he focuses on encouraging individuals to better their education in order to increase their level of productivity. He states that if people were to do these things, they would have many more opportunities available for them to better their economic situations. 

He also inspired much work in international development in the 1980s, motivating investments in vocational and technical education by Bretton Woods system International Financial Institutions such as the International Monetary Fund and the World Bank. During his research Schultz got down to details and went out among the poor farming nations of Europe, talking to farmers and political leaders in small towns. He was "not afraid to get his shoes a little muddy." He noticed that the aid the United States sent in the form of food or money was not only of little help but actually harmful to such nations, as the farmers and agricultural producers within those nations were not able to compete with the free prices of the "aid" sent and therefore they were not able to sustain themselves or invest the money they made from crops back into the economy.  He theorized that if the U.S. instead used its resources to help educate these rural producers and provide them with technology and innovations they would be more stable, productive  and self sustaining in the long run. This was another key part of his work "Investment in Human Capital".

Nobel Memorial Prize in Economic Sciences
Schultz was awarded the Nobel Prize jointly with Sir William Arthur Lewis for his work in development economics, focusing on the economics of agriculture. He analyzed the role of agriculture within the economy, and his work has had far reaching implications for industrialization policy, both in developing and developed nations. Schultz also promulgated the idea of educational capital, an offshoot of the concept of human capital, relating specifically to the investments made in education.

Family and personal life
Schultz married Esther Florence Werth (1905–1991) in 1930. She was born and raised on a farm near Frankfort, South Dakota of German parents, who encouraged her to pursue schooling. Werth was the first in her family to attend college, receiving a bachelor's degree in commercial science from South Dakota State College in Brookings in 1927, and subsequently worked as a school teacher in Waubay, South Dakota from 1927 to 1929 and then in Gregory, South Dakota from 1929 to 1930.  Werth shared Schultz's background in agriculture and commitment to ideals of education and economic development, and throughout his career worked as a primary editor of his published works.  In his Nobel Prize Lecture, he acknowledged her contributions thus: "I am also indebted to my wife, Esther Schultz, for her insistence that what I thought was stated clearly was not clear enough." The couple was survived by two daughters and one son.

Legacy
Schultz received eight honorary degrees in his career. He had the distinction of being the first South Dakota State University graduate and the second South Dakotan to win a Nobel Prize after Ernest Lawrence winner of the 1939 Nobel Prize for Physics. Between 2012 and 2013, South Dakota State University built the Theodore W. Schultz Hall, a residence hall for students pursuing degrees in agriculture. 
Schultz also was awarded the Francis A. Walker Medal in 1972, which is the highest award given out by the American Economic Association.

Schultz died in Evanston, Illinois on February 26, 1998 at the age of 95. He is interred at Badger Cemetery in Badger, South Dakota.

Quotes

Articles

Books authored
 1943. Redirecting Farm Policy, New York: Macmillan Company.
 1945. Agriculture in an Unstable Economy, New York: McGraw-Hill.
 1953. The Economic Organization of Agriculture, McGraw-Hill.
 1963. The Economic Value of Education, New York: Columbia University Press.
 1964. Transforming Traditional Agriculture, New Haven: Yale University Press.
 1968.Economic Growth and Agriculture, New York: MacGraw-Hill.
 1971. Investment in Human Capital: The Role of Education and of Research, New York: Free Press.
 1972. Human Resources (Human Capital: Policy Issues and Research Opportunities), New York: National Bureau of Economic Research,
 1981. Investing in People, University of California Press. Description and chapter-preview links.
 1993. The Economics of Being Poor, Cambridge, Massachusetts, Blackwell Publishers
 1993. Origins of Increasing Returns, Cambridge, Massachusetts, Blackwell Publishers

Books edited
 1945. Food for the World, Chicago: University of Chicago Press.
 1962. Investment in Human Beings, Chicago: University of Chicago Press.
 1972. Investment in Education: Equity-Efficiency Quandary, Chicago: University of Chicago Press.
 1973.New Economic Approaches to Fertility, Chicago: University of Chicago Press,
 1974. Economics of the Family: Marriage, Children, and Human Capital, Chicago: University of Chicago Press.

References

External links

 
 
 D. Gale Johnson, "Theodore William Schultz", Biographical Memoirs of the National Academy of Sciences (1999)
 

American Nobel laureates
Nobel laureates in Economics
People from Kingsbury County, South Dakota
South Dakota State University alumni
University of Wisconsin–Madison College of Agricultural and Life Sciences alumni
Iowa State University faculty
University of Chicago faculty
1902 births
1998 deaths
20th-century American economists
Presidents of the American Economic Association
Distinguished Fellows of the American Economic Association
National Bureau of Economic Research
Economists from South Dakota
American people of German descent
Chicago School economists
Members of the American Philosophical Society